The Snowman is a 2007 novel by Norwegian crime-writer Jo Nesbø. It is the seventh entry in his Harry Hole series.

Plot
In 1980, a married woman has illicit sex with a lover while her adolescent son waits in a car outside; their lovemaking is disturbed when they think somebody is looking at them from outside the window, which turns out to have been only a tall snowman. Twenty-four years later, Norwegian police inspector Harry Hole investigates a string of murders of women around Oslo. His FBI training leads him to search for links between the cases, and he finds two of them—each victim is a married mother and a snowman appears at every murder scene.

Looking through cold cases, Hole realises that he is tracking Norway's earliest known serial killer. Most of the victims vanished after the first snowfall of winter, and snowmen were found near each scene. Further digging leads Hole and his team, including newcomer Katrine Bratt, to suspect that paternity issues with the children of the victims may be a motive for the murders. They discover that all of the victims' children have different biological fathers from the men they believe to be their father. Following DNA testing, results lead the investigation down a few wrong turns and several suspects are eliminated from the inquiry.

Within a short time, Hole and Bratt are romantically drawn together, although Hole does not pursue her overture. Hole sees her as a kindred spirit and a brilliant, dedicated detective in her own right. However, suspicion falls on Bratt being the killer after she attempts to frame one of the prime suspects. Hole chases her across Norway and catches up with her at a previously discovered murder site. She is apprehended and committed to a psychiatric unit. Hole's superiors, concerned that Bratt's arrest for the murders will damage their reputation, suggest putting Hole forward as a scapegoat for the press. Harry's superior, Gunnar Hagen, intervenes and offers himself as scapegoat in Harry's stead.

When another victim is discovered, Hole realises that the killer is still at large. Due to a random thought triggered by a chance comment, he makes a vital connection that ultimately leads him to the identity of the true perpetrator. His success in finally apprehending the killer obviates any need for a scapegoat, and Bratt, following further mental stability checks, returns to her post in Bergen.

Reception
Thomas Kaufmann wrote that "The Snowman gives us suspense and a veritable gallery of memorable suspects makes it a great read. Once Alfred Hitchcock talked about people taking a roller-coaster ride – how they would scream going down the hill, and laugh when they were finished. Some people like to be entertained in this way, Hitch said, and he was just a fellow who built roller coasters. The Snowman is a first-class roller-coaster ride."

Film adaptation

A film adaptation of the novel The Snowman was developed by British production company Working Title Films. In 2013, Martin Scorsese was attached to direct the film. In 2014, Tomas Alfredson was hired to direct. On September 8, 2015, Michael Fassbender was in talks to join the film for the lead role. On October 14, 2015, Rebecca Ferguson was cast in the film to play the female lead role. Alfredson's Another Park Film co-produced the film, starting production in January 2016.  The film was released in the UK on 13 October 2017. Unlike the novel, the film was poorly received by critics.

References

Sources

External links

2007 Norwegian novels
Novels set in Oslo
Harry Hole (novel series)
Norwegian crime novels
Fiction set in 2004
Aschehoug books
Norwegian novels adapted into films
Fiction set in 1980
Fictional snowmen
21st-century Norwegian novels